24 Camelopardalis is a star in the northern circumpolar constellation of Camelopardalis, located 192 light years away from the Sun. It is near the lower limit of visibility to the naked eye, appearing as a dim, orange-hued star with an apparent visual magnitude of 6.05. This object is moving closer to the Earth with a heliocentric radial velocity of −31 km/s.

The stellar classification of this star is K0 III, matching an evolved giant star that has exhausted the hydrogen at its core and expanded. It is 2.5 billion years old with 1.6 times the mass of the Sun and has grown to five times the Sun's radius. The star is radiating 14 times the luminosity of the Sun from its enlarged photosphere at an effective temperature of 4,931 K.

References

K-type giants
Camelopardalis (constellation)
Durchmusterung objects
Camelopardalis, 24
037601
026942
1941